Julienne Hince is the Australian High Commissioner to Malta (2016–), replacing Jane Lambert.  She is also accredited as non-resident Ambassador to Tunisia.

She has a Graduate Diploma in Foreign Affairs from the Australian National University and a Bachelor of Arts from the University of Melbourne.

References

Living people
Year of birth missing (living people)
Australian women ambassadors
High Commissioners of Australia to Malta
Ambassadors of Australia to Tunisia
Australian National University alumni
University of Melbourne alumni